Budget Suites of America is an American privately owned extended stay apartment chain founded in 1987 and owned by American entrepreneur Robert Bigelow.

It caters to budget travelers needing to stay for an extended period. Its rooms are primarily suites featuring a full kitchen. Budget Suites owns three hotels in Phoenix, Arizona; four in Las Vegas, Nevada; ten in Dallas, Texas; and one in San Antonio, Texas.

See also

 List of hotels

References

External links

American companies established in 1987
Companies based in Irving, Texas
Hotels established in 1987
Hotel chains in the United States